Square Enix is a Japanese video game development and publishing company formed from the merger of video game developer Square and publisher Enix on April 1, 2003. The company is best known for its role-playing video game franchises, which include the Final Fantasy, Dragon Quest, and Kingdom Hearts series. Of its intellectual properties (IPs), the Final Fantasy franchise is the best-selling, with total worldwide sales of over 173 million units. The Dragon Quest series has sold over 85 million units worldwide while the Kingdom Hearts series has shipped over 36 million copies worldwide. Since its inception, the company has developed or published hundreds of titles in various video game franchises on numerous gaming systems.

Square Enix acquired Taito in September 2005, which operates as a subsidiary, and the parent company Eidos plc (shortly renamed from SCi Entertainment) of British publisher Eidos Interactive in April 2009, which has been merged with Square Enix's European distribution wing and renamed as Square Enix Europe. This list includes some retail games where Square Enix was the developer or primary publisher after its formation (excluding games distributed in Japan by Square Enix Company Limited). As well as some games primarily published or distributed by the group's North American branch, Square Enix Incorporated. However, it does not include games published by subsidiary Taito or primarily by the group's European branch, Square Enix Limited.

 For games released before the merger, see List of Square video games and List of Enix games.
 For mobile games released by the company, see List of Square Enix mobile games.
 For game franchises, see List of Square Enix video game franchises.
 For games released by Taito, both before and after the acquisition, see List of Taito games
 For games released by Eidos before acquisition see List of Eidos Interactive games, and for games primarily published by the group's European branch see List of Square Enix Europe games.

Video games

Notes

References

External links
 Official European game list
 Official North American game list
 Official Japanese game list 

Video game lists by company